Vasilika is a community and a municipal unit of the Thermi municipality. Before the 2011 local government reform the municipal unit of Vasilika was an independent municipality, with the respective community being the seat. The 2011 census recorded 4,200 inhabitants in the community and 9,911 inhabitants in the municipal unit. The community of Vasilika covers an area of 56.81 km2 while the respective municipal unit covers an area of 200.336 km2.

According to the statistics of Vasil Kanchov ("Macedonia, Ethnography and Statistics"), 2.000 Greek Christians lived in the village in 1900.

Administrative division
The community of Vasilika consists of two separate settlements: 
Lakkia (population 438)
Vasilika (population 3,762)
The aforementioned population figures are as of 2011.

See also
 List of settlements in the Thessaloniki regional unit

References

Populated places in Thessaloniki (regional unit)